The 4734th Air Defense Group is a discontinued United States Air Force organization. Its last assignment was with the 64th Air Division (AD) at Thule Air Base, Greenland, where it was discontinued in 1958.  The group was formed in 1957 when ADC assumed responsibility for air defense of Greenland from Northeast Air Command.  It controlled a fighter-interceptor squadron at Thule and a squadron operating a radar at nearby Pingarsuak Mountain.  It was discontinued in 1958 and its mission transferred to the 64th AD in Newfoundland.

History
The group was organized in 1957 as a command and control organization at Thule Air Base by Air Defense Command (ADC) when ADC took over the atmospheric defense assets of the inactivating Northeast Air Command (NEAC) at the base in 1957. It was assigned to the 64th AD to manage ADC fighter and radar units at Thule. Its squadrons had both been assigned to the 64th AD when the division was a NEAC unit. Its 74th Fighter-Interceptor Squadron (FIS) flew Northrop F-89 Scorpion aircraft. The group was a tenant organization at Thule AB, a Strategic Air Command base, whose 4083d Air Base Group was the host organization for the base. The 4734th was discontinued due to funding cutbacks in 1958, and its assets were assumed directly by the 64th AD, with the establishment of Detachment 1, 64th AD at Thule.

Lineage
 Organized as 4734th Air Defense Group on 1 April 1957
 Discontinued on 1 May 1958

Assignments
 64th Air Division, 1 April 1957 – 1 May 1958

Components
 74th Fighter-Interceptor Squadron
 Thule AB, Greenland, 1 April 1957 – 1 May 1958
 931st Aircraft Control and Warning Squadron
 Thule AB, Greenland, 1 April 1957 – 1 May 1958 (located on Pingarsuak Mountain)

Stations
 Thule AB, Greenland, 1 April 1957 – 1 May 1958

Aircraft
 F-89C, 1957–1958

Commander
 Col James T. Jarman, 1 April 1957 – 1 May 1958

See also
 United States general surveillance radar stations
 List of United States Air Force Aerospace Defense Command Interceptor Squadrons
 List of United States Air Force aircraft control and warning squadrons

References

Notes

Bibliography

 
 
 

Aerospace Defense Command units
Four digit groups of the United States Air Force
Air defense groups of the United States Air Force
Military units and formations established in 1957